Cohen (kōhēn, "priest") is a surname of Jewish, Samaritan and Biblical origins (see: Kohen). It is a very common Jewish surname (the most common in Israel), and the following information discusses only that origin. Cohen is one of the four Samaritan last names that exist in the modern day. Many Jewish immigrants entering the United States or United Kingdom changed their name from Cohen to Cowan (sometimes spelled "Cowen"), as Cowan was a Scottish name. The name "Cohen" is also used as a given name.

Origin

Bearing the surname often (although not always) indicates that one's patrilineal ancestors were priests in the Temple of Jerusalem. Although not all Kohenic lines stem from Aaron, the brother of Moses, he is generally regarded as the patriarch of the lineage and the first Kohen. A single such priest was known as a Kohen, and the hereditary caste descending from these priests is collectively known as the Kohanim. As multiple languages were acquired through the Jewish diaspora, the surname acquired dozens of variants. Not all persons with related surnames are kohanim, and not all kohanim have related surnames.

Some Kohanim have added a secondary appellation to their surname, so as to distinguish themselves from other Kohanim—such as Cohen-Scali of Morocco, who trace their lineage to Zadok, and Cohen-Maghari (Meguri) of Yemen, who trace their lineage to the first ward, Jehoiariv, in the division of twenty-four priestly wards.

Being a Kohen imposes some limitations: by Jewish law a Kohen may not marry a divorced woman, and may not marry a proselyte (someone who converted to Judaism). Nor should an observant Kohen come into contact with the dead or enter a cemetery.

An effort to trace whether people named 'Cohen' actually have a common genetic origin has been undertaken, using a genealogical DNA test associated with the Cohen Modal Haplotype.

Katz
The Katz surname is a possible indicator of being a Kohen/Cohen: it may stem from "Kohen Tzedek". The latter word means "righteous or authentic priest."

Other last names with similar indication are Kohentov and Kohenteb; the suffix literally means good, meaning that one could rely on them as being a Kohen when needing one for redeeming a firstborn male child.

See also
Variants of Cohen

Variant surnames
 Coyne
 Coinn
 Cahn
 Coen
 Cohan
 Cohn
 Kahane
 Kahanow
 Kahn
 Kohn
 Kon (surname) Polish variant
 Cowan
 Kaner
 Kagan (surname) (transliterated from Russian)
 Kaganovich (disambiguation)
 Kogan
 Kogen (disambiguation)
 Kogon (surname)
 Kohányi
 Kohen
 Chapman
 Kohanian, Kohanyan
 Kots
List of people with surname Cohen
Cowan (surname)#As a Jewish surname

References

External links 
 "The Tribe: The Cohen-Levi Family Heritage"

Hebrew-language surnames
Kohenitic surnames
Jewish surnames
Occupational surnames
Modern names of Hebrew origin